Drew van Coller (born 9 February 1987) is a South African rugby union player who most recently played for the  in the Vodacom Cup and Currie Cup competitions.

He was a member of the Pumas side that won the Vodacom Cup for the first time in 2015, beating  24–7 in the final. Van Coller made five appearances during the season.

References

South African rugby union players
Living people
1987 births
Pumas (Currie Cup) players
Griquas (rugby union) players
Free State Cheetahs players
Rugby union props
Rugby union players from Johannesburg
Afrikaner people
University of the Free State alumni